The Frederick, Jr., and Mary F. Reber House is a historic house in Santa Clara, Utah. It was built in 1900 for Frederick Reber, Jr., an immigrant from Switzerland who converted to the Church of Jesus Christ of Latter-day Saints, and his wife, née Mary Frie. It was deeded to their son Leo in 1954. It has been listed on the National Register of Historic Places since February 12, 1999.

References

National Register of Historic Places in Washington County, Utah
Georgian architecture in Utah
Houses completed in 1900
1900 establishments in Utah